The Lost Topic Tapes: Isle of Wight 1957 is an album by American folk musician Ramblin' Jack Elliott, released in 2004. Elliott recorded a number of albums on the Topic label in London in the 1950s. The songs on this compilation are taken from rediscovered tapes found in the British Library in London. They were recorded on a yacht at Cowes Harbour in 1957. Several songs were issued in Britain on Jack Takes the Floor.

Reception

Writing for Allmusic, music critic Steve Leggett wrote the album "Brooklyn's most famous folk cowboy, Ramblin' Jack Elliott was part genuine preservationist and part a walking, talking pastiche of Woody Guthrie crossed with a back-porch Appalachian moonshiner. The public act sometimes gets in the way of the fact that Elliott was an excellent interpreter of American traditional folk material, carefully representing its styles and rhythms on guitar and banjo, and he duplicated rural vocal nuances with purposeful precision..."

Track listing
"Intro" – 0:49
"T for Texas" (Jimmie Rodgers) – 4:08
"Howdido" (Woody Guthrie) – 1:49
"I Thought I Heard Buddy Bolden Say" (Jelly Roll Morton) – 2:16
"Crash on the Highway" (Dorsey M. Dixon) – 2:16
"Candy Man" (Reverend Gary Davis) – 1:28
"Ballad of John Henry" (Traditional) – 2:21
"Car Song" (Guthrie) – 2:13
"Roll in My Sweet Baby's Arms" (Traditional) – 3:35
"Old Blue" (Traditional) – 2:49
"Don't You Leave Me Here" (Guthrie) – 1:35
"Why Oh Why" (Guthrie) – 1:54
"In the Shade of the Old Apple Tree" (Traditional) – 3:24
"Oklahoma Hills" (Guthrie) – 2:11
"Rock Island Line" (Traditional) – 5:16
"Closing/Railroad Bill" (Traditional) – 0:41

Personnel
Ramblin' Jack Elliott – vocals, guitar
Production notes:
Bruce Bromberg – project supervisor
Larry Sloven – project supervisor
Richard Swettenham – engineer
Bill Leader – assistant engineer
Bob Stone – editing, remastering
Dick Reeves – graphic design

References

External links
Ramblin' Jack Elliott Illustrated discography

Ramblin' Jack Elliott compilation albums
2004 compilation albums